Massimiliano "Max" Biaggi (born 26 June 1971) is an Italian former professional Grand Prix motorcycle road racer who achieved six World Championships. With four 250 cc road race titles and two in World Superbikes, he is one of only two riders to score championships across both disciplines.

Biaggi is a brand ambassador for Aprilia motorcycles. Since 2019, he has owned a Moto3 racing team, based in Monaco.

In 2020, Biaggi was named a FIM Road Racing Legend, followed by inductance into the MotoGP Hall of Fame in 2022.

Career

Summarised race history
Biaggi is a 13-time Premier Class race winner.

This proved to be Biaggi's final season in MotoGP.

In 2007 Biaggi switched to the Superbike World Championship finishing third overall as a rookie and earned his first Superbike World Championship in 2010 becoming only the second European from outside the United Kingdom after Raymond Roche to do so. After winning a second Superbike World Championship in 2012 at the age of 41, Biaggi retired from racing. But he came back in 2015 in Malaysia as a wildcard to get a podium at the age of 44.

Winning a race for 7 consecutive seasons in the Premier Class from 1998 to 2004. Biaggi's 13 wins, 58 podiums and 23 Pole Positions in the Premier Class makes him one of the most accomplished riders to not win the MotoGP World Championship.

125cc World Championship
Biaggi was more interested in football as a child.  But in 1989, after he was given a motorcycle for his seventeenth birthday, he began his racing career in the 125cc class at age eighteen.  In 1990 he won the Italian Sport Production Championship.  Following his success in 125cc, Biaggi moved up to the 250cc class.

250cc World Championship
In 1991, Biaggi finished second behind British rider Woolsey Coulter in the European 250cc championship on an Aprilia RS250, and that same year he finished twenty-seventh in the Grand Prix motorcycle 250cc world championship riding for the same manufacturer.  In 1992, Biaggi completed his first entire season in 250cc Grand Prix for Aprilia, and finished the season fifth overall.  In that same season he took his first victory in Kyalami, South Africa.  The following season, Biaggi joined Honda, and finished fourth in the championship standings, including a single victory in Barcelona.  In 1994 he returned to Aprilia and dominated the 250cc Grand Prix class by winning three consecutive world championships in 1994, 1995 and 1996. In 1997, Biaggi again returned to Honda, riding for Erv Kanemoto's team, and won his fourth consecutive title.  Following that, he moved up to the 500cc class.

500cc World Championship
Biaggi made an impressive start in his 500cc debut, qualifying on pole, setting the fastest lap and winning his first race in the 1998 Japanese motorcycle Grand Prix at Suzuka, riding for the Kanemoto Honda team.  He was also victorious at the Czech Republic Grand Prix, where he almost crashed when he accidentally did a 90° wheelie, and finished the season in second place behind Mick Doohan.  Biaggi then joined Yamaha to battle against the dominant Hondas.  He finished fourth in 1999, third in 2000, and second in 2001.

MotoGP World Championship

In 2002, Biaggi rode the four-stroke for the first time as development on the new motorcycle remained strong throughout the season.  He won in Brno, Czech Republic and Sepang, Malaysia to clinch runner-up in the championship behind rival Valentino Rossi.  In 2003, Biaggi finished third in the MotoGP championship after rejoining Honda on the Camel Pramac Pons team and won races in Pacific Grand Prix and Great Britain after Rossi penalised. It was expected that Biaggi would be one of the main candidates for the title in 2004. He won in Germany but a crash in Estoril saw his season begin to fade.  At the end of the 2004 MotoGP season Biaggi finished the championship in third place, behind Sete Gibernau and series winner, Rossi.

Biaggi started the 2005 MotoGP season as an official factory Honda rider, joining American racer Nicky Hayden on the Repsol Honda Team with technical director Erv Kanemoto.  It was hoped that continued cooperation with Kanemoto and the full factory support from Honda would make Biaggi one of the main title contenders in 2005.  However,  Biaggi finished the season in only fifth place.

Biaggi lost his ride for the 2006 season, his position filled by 2005 250cc Grand Prix champion, Dani Pedrosa.  He negotiated with Honda, Kawasaki, and Suzuki, however, was unable to land a contract even with the backing of major tobacco sponsor Camel who ended up signing up to be the factory Yamaha squad's title sponsor for 2006.  On 10 January 2006, Biaggi posted on his website that he would not take part in the 2006 MotoGP season.

Superbike World Championship

Biaggi began the season by winning the first race at the Losail International Circuit in Qatar and finishing second in race two. In doing so Max Biaggi became one of only five men to win their first Superbike World Championship race, and the only rider ever to win his first Superbike race and his first race in 500cc Grand Prix. He then finished 3rd and 4th at Phillip Island, Australia.

After a hard championship Biaggi finished third, behind World Champion James Toseland and Yamaha top rider Noriyuki Haga.

At the end of the season, Francis Batta, Alstare Suzuki Racing Team director, was forced to release Biaggi, due to the loss of the main sponsor Corona Extra, as they could not reach financial agreement. For  Biaggi replaced team manager Marco Borciani as a rider at his Team Sterilgarda/Go Eleven, riding a satellite-works Ducati 1098RS alongside Ruben Xaus. He finished seventh overall with seven podiums, three places ahead of Xaus and one ahead of factory Ducati rider Michel Fabrizio.

For 2009 he joined the returning factory Aprilia team. He took a double podium in round 2 at Qatar, and scored solid points before taking their first win since the return at Brno, after race leaders Fabrizio and Ben Spies collided. He finished a close second behind Spies in race two there, and finished the season 4th overall.

Biaggi continued with Aprilia for 2010, taking a double victory at the team's home race at Monza to move up to second in the standings. Another double in the USA gave him first place in the championship, after previous leader Leon Haslam failed to finish in race 2.

In August 2010, Biaggi signed a renewed, two-year contract with Aprilia to remain with the team in World Superbikes until 2012.

In 2010, Biaggi became Aprilia's and Italy's first Superbike World Champion.

2011 was a year of mixed results for Biaggi and Aprilia. He only managed 2 wins at Aragon, Spain and Brno, Czech Republic. Even though he was in contention for the title due to multiple second-place finishes, Biaggi fractured his left foot in Germany which caused him to miss 2 rounds: Imola and Magny Cours. Biaggi ended the 2011 season in third place (303 points) and tied in points with Eugene Laverty. Biaggi would go on to win the 2012 title by only a half point over Tom Sykes. Following the season, Biaggi retired from racing. Three years later, Biaggi would briefly return to racing as a wildcard for Aprilia.

Personal life
Biaggi is known as the 'Roman Emperor' and 'Mad Max' and is notorious for his difficult relationships with the press, team personnel and other riders.

He was engaged to Miss Italia 2002 winner and TV personality Eleonora Pedron; together they have a daughter and a son. They split in September 2015.

Career statistics

Grand Prix motorcycle racing

By season
All stats according to MotoGP.com

Races by year
(key) (Races in bold indicate pole position, races in italics indicate fastest lap)

Superbike World Championship

By season

Races by year
(key) (Races in bold indicate pole position, races in italics indicate fastest lap)

References

External links

 Max-Biaggi.com – Official site

Italian expatriates in Monaco
Italian expatriates in the United States
Italian motorcycle racers
Repsol Honda MotoGP riders
Yamaha Motor Racing MotoGP riders
500cc World Championship riders
250cc World Championship riders
Sportspeople from Rome
1971 births
Living people
Superbike World Championship riders
MotoGP World Championship riders
250cc World Riders' Champions